Daniel Lloyd is a Nigerian actor and talent manager. In 2016 Lloyd was nominated for Most Promising Actor of the Year (English) at the City People Entertainment Awards.

Early life and education
Lloyd is from the Ijaw tribe in Bayelsa State. Lloyd was born in Lagos State. Lloyd graduated from the Enugu State University of Science and Technology with a B.Sc. degree in civil engineering.

Career
Lloyd started his career by featuring in a television series soap opera titled Pradah. He played the role of a character called Patrick.

Lloyd is one of the first Nigerian actors to feature in the Bollywood section in a movie titled J.U.D.E where he played the role of a character named Jude.

Lloyd asides from being an actor used to be a talent manager and managed the Nigerian artist Timaya whom he met at the "straight  to star" talent hunt show event in Port Harcourt in 2006 whilst Timaya was in the music category of the show, Lloyd was in the acting category of the show.

Award and nomination
Nominated for Most Promising Actor of the Year (English) at the City People Entertainment Awards in 2016.

Personal life
Lloyd's father was an engineer who worked for Shell oil company in Nigeria and encouraged Llyod to become an engineer as well and was upset with Llyod for abandoning his engineering career for acting after obtaining a degree in civil engineering.

In 2019, Daniel Loyd married a Nollywood actress Empress Njamah.

Filmography 
Timeless Love
Gidi Blues
The Wrong Number
Love Triangle
Our Dirty Little Secrets 
The Chronicles (2018)
The Friend Zone (2017) as Dennis 
A Love Story (2017)
Hire A Man (2017)
The Real Side Chicks (2017) 
Flirting with Fifty (2017)
Hello (2016) 
Gidi Blues (2016)
Desperate Baby Mama (2015) as Greg
Forever Within Us (2015)
Pradah as Patrick
Tempted to Touch (2006)
Akpe: Return of the Beast (2019)

References

External links

Twitter Page

Living people
Nigerian male film actors
21st-century Nigerian male actors
Male actors from Lagos State
Year of birth missing (living people)
Enugu State University of Science and Technology alumni
Nigerian male television actors
People from Bayelsa State